Eburia charmata is a species of beetle in the family Cerambycidae that is endemic to Brazil.

References

charmata
Beetles described in 1981
Endemic fauna of Brazil
Beetles of South America